is a Japanese football player. He plays for FC Machida Zelvia.

Career

Club 
Jun Okano joined J2 League club JEF United Chiba in 2016.

International 
In 2015, he had chosen Japanese International U-18 England expedition team member with Takahiro Yanagi, Reiya Morishita, Itsuki Urata, Takumi Hasegawa, Daniel Matsuzaka and Kakeru Funaki as defender.

In 30th Dec 2017, he had chosen Japanese International U-20 Thailand expedition team member.

Club statistics
Updated to 25 February 2019.

References

External links
Profile at JEF United Chiba

1997 births
Living people
Association football people from Chiba Prefecture
Japanese footballers
J1 League players
J2 League players
JEF United Chiba players
Oita Trinita players
FC Machida Zelvia players
Association football defenders